Jean-Jacques Blairon (9 August 1947 – 14 July 2020) was a Belgian musician active in the 1980s under the name J. J. Lionel.

References

External links
Profile, dailymotion.com; accessed 15 July 2020.
 

Belgian musicians
1947 births
2020 deaths
21st-century Belgian musicians
20th-century Belgian musicians